The British Rail Class 43 diesel-hydraulic locomotives were built by the North British Locomotive Company (NBL) from 1960 to 1962. They were numbered D833–D865.

Classification

The D800 series diesel-hydraulic 'Warship Class', of B-B wheel arrangement, was constructed by two different builders. Those locomotives built by British Railways at Swindon Works were originally numbered D800-D832 and D866-D870. They were allocated Class 42 under the 1968 classification system, while those built by the North British Locomotive Company (NBL) were originally numbered D833-D865 and allocated Class 43.  Because of their early withdrawal dates, neither the Swindon- nor the NBL-built locomotives carried TOPS numbers.  More detail on factors common to both types can be found in the article on the Swindon-built British Rail Class 42.

Mechanical details

The NBL-built D800s differed mechanically from the Swindon-built batch: the Swindon locomotives used Maybach engines connected to Mekydro hydraulic transmissions whereas the NBL-built examples used MAN engines and Voith transmissions.  NBL had entered into an arrangement with the German company MAN AG in the early 1950s to market MAN's engine designs in the UK: NBL was anxious to enter the diesel locomotive market, especially once it became apparent that British Railways would be seeking large quantities of such locomotives when the "Modernisation Plan" was announced.  MAN were equally keen to obtain a slice of the UK market for themselves.  The first results of this collaboration were the D600-D604 locomotives which failed to take advantage of the weight-saving potential of light alloy stressed-skin construction allied to hydraulic transmissions.

No further examples of this design were ordered but NBL then received an order for 33 locomotives to a more advanced design, the D800 design drawn up by Swindon Works in turn derived from the original German Krauss-Maffei V200 design. Unlike the Mekydro four-speed transmissions in the Swindon-built locomotives, the Voith was only a three-speed design but was chosen because it kept compatibility with D600-4 and because NBL already had a licence to manufacture it. Whereas the Swindon-built locomotives had all their engines and transmissions supplied by the German manufacturers (albeit with ten engines and three transmissions supplied as kits of parts for the British licensee to re-assemble) the engines and transmissions required for D833-65 were all built by NBL.

Operation

In operational service, the NBL locomotives were less reliable than their Swindon-built cousins. Mild steel was used for the exhaust manifolds and these components were prone to fracture.  Not only did this result in a loss of exhaust pressure to drive the turbochargers but also the driving cabs rapidly filled with exhaust fumes.  The MAN-built engines used in the German DB class V 200 design had nickel-resist steel manifolds and were far less troublesome.  The engine design also suffered from being quite highly rated for a design with no active piston cooling and piston ring life expectancy was decreased as a result.  One MAN L12V18/21B was sent to the British Internal Combustion Engine Research Association for various tests and potential modifications to improve the deficiencies but nothing ever came of this. Further problems arose because of the conversion from metric to imperial feet and inches when the MAN drawings were received by NBL.  It is almost certain that rounding errors in these conversions resulted in poor tolerances and lowered reliability in practice. Despite all this, figures for 1965 show the North British Warships covered a far greater annual mileage than contemporary Type 4's such as the Westerns, Peaks and Brush Type 4.

Despite being their last year in service, Class 43 locomotives were still hauling long-distance passenger trains over the summer of 1971 on services between Paddington and locations in Devon.

Accidents and incidents
 On 25 August 1962, locomotive No. D833 Panther was hauling a passenger train that came to a halt at Torquay, Devon due to defects on the locomotive. Another passenger train overran signals and was in a rear-end collision. Twenty-three people were injured.
 On 11 January 1967, locomotive No. D864 Zambesi at St Annes Bristol was running light, (by itself), on the up line when it came into contact with the destroyed rear coach of an accident on the down line where the diverted 12:00 Paddington to Swansea had just collided with the rear of the 11:45 Paddington to Bristol. Only very minor damage was sustained by No. D864, which came into glancing contact with the splayed out body panels of the last coach of the Bristol train.
 On 27 September 1967, locomotive No. D853 Thruster was hauling the 09:45 Paddington to Weston super Mare, which travelled too fast on the relief line through Foxhall Junction, Didcot, and derailed causing one death and 23 injuries. The derailment was caused by the train being driven at excessive speed through the crossover.

Withdrawal

The NBL-built D800s were withdrawn before their Class 42 sisters, themselves doomed to a short life because of the decision to standardise on diesel-electric transmission for mainline locomotives. None have survived into preservation. Many of the names were allocated to Class 50 locomotives, which were also named after British warships.  They were allocated to Bristol Bath Road, Laira Plymouth, Newton Abbot and Old Oak Common.

Class details
Built by NBL, date of order 3 July 1958, maker's order no. L100, Swindon lot no. 443

References

Sources

Further reading

External links

 

43 1
43 1
NBL locomotives
B-B locomotives
Railway locomotives introduced in 1960
Standard gauge locomotives of Great Britain
Scrapped locomotives
B′B′ locomotives